KrasAvia is a scheduled and charter passenger airline based in Krasnoyarsk, Russia. It was established in 1956 as Turin Airline before being renamed Evenkia Avia in 2002 and KrasAvia in 2007. It is Russia's largest regional carrier, with a fleet of 44 aircraft and helicopters. The airline is owned by the administration of the Krasnoyarsk region.

Destinations

Krasnoyarsk-Yemelyanovo Airport with Antonov AN-26B-100 to

 Tura, Krasnoyarsk Krai
 Baikit
 Vanavara
 Tunguska
 Khatanga

Tura, Krasnoyarsk Krai with Antonov AN-26B-100 to

 Krasnoyarsk-Yemelyanovo Airport 
 Khatanga

Baikit with Antonov AN-26B-100 to

 Krasnoyarsk-Yemelyanovo Airport

Vanavara with Antonov AN-26B-100 to

 Krasnoyarsk-Yemelyanovo Airport

Tunguska with Antonov AN-26B-100 to

 Krasnoyarsk-Yemelyanovo Airport

Khatanga with Antonov AN-26B-100 to

 Tura, Krasnoyarsk Krai
 Krasnoyarsk-Yemelyanovo Airport 
 Norilsk

Norilsk with Antonov AN-26B-100 to

 Dikson
 Khatanga

Dikson with Antonov AN-26B-100 to

 Norilsk

Tura, Krasnoyarsk Krai with Mil Mi-8 (flights also operate from these destinations back to Tour) to

 Baikit
 Vanavara
 Ekonda
 Chirinda
 Esey
 Uchami
 Tutonchana
 Kislokan
 Yuktali
 Nidym

Baikit with Mil Mi-8 (flights also operate from these destinations back to Baikit) to

 Kayumba
 Osharova
 Miryuga
 Burnyy
Kuzmovka
Sulomai
 Tunguska (Irkutsk Oblast)
 Poligus
 Surinda
 Vanavara

Vanavara with Mil Mi-8 (flights also operate from these destinations back to Vanavara) to

 Strelka-Chunya
 Chemdalsk
 Oskoba
 Mutoray

Khatanga with Mil Mi-8 (flights also operate from these destinations back to Khatanga) to

 Novorybnaya
 Syndassko 
 Popigay (rural locality)
 Novaya
 Heth
 Kataryk
 Kotuy

Fleet

As of October 2021, the KrasAvia fleet included the following aircraft:

References

External links
 Homepage (Russian)

Airlines of Russia
Government-owned companies of Russia
Companies based in Krasnoyarsk